The Putna is a right tributary of the river Suceava in Romania. It discharges into the Suceava in Gura Putnei near Vicovu de Sus.

References

Rivers of Romania
Rivers of Suceava County